A Man Called Sledge is a 1970 Italian Spaghetti Western film starring James Garner in an extremely offbeat role as a grimly evil thief, and featuring Dennis Weaver, Claude Akins and Wayde Preston. The film was written by Vic Morrow and Frank Kowalski, and directed by Morrow in Techniscope.

Garner wrote in his memoirs that this movie was "one of the few times I've played a heavy and one of the last. I wish I could remember why I let Dino de Laurentiis talk me into this turkey. The poster says "Not suitable for children." It should say "not suitable for consumption."

Plot
Luther Sledge (Garner), a wanted outlaw, is visiting his prostitute girlfriend, Ria (Antonelli), when one of his gang is shot over a poker game. Sledge kills the murderers, and is recognized by an old man (Marley), who follows him. Sledge waylays the old man, who then relates a tale of a periodic gold shipment that is heavily guarded by forty riders, but stops at a prison where the old man was incarcerated for years.

Sledge assembles his regular gang (including Joyce, Bice, Gutherie, Beetle, Kehoe and Hooker), they investigate the story, and equip themselves for the endeavor. The local sheriff (Preston) recognizes the old man from the prison, causing a shootout, and Sledge and his gang flee.

The gang begins observing the gold guards and testing their defenses.  Seeing how difficult it is to approach, the gang decides to get into the prison, turn the prisoners loose, and steal the gold in the ensuing havoc. Sledge is taken to the prison by Ward (Weaver), who poses as a US Marshal needing to lock up his prisoner for the night. The warden (Garrone) is reluctant to incarcerate Sledge because he thinks it is the sheriff's business, but the sheriff arrives and attacks Sledge for killing a deputy earlier, convincing the warden to allow them to stay in a cell for the night. Later, Sledge, Ward, and nearby prisoners overpower the warden, killing him in the process. Taking his keys, they free the remaining prisoners, who begin to take over the rest of the prison. Sledge's gang dynamites the prison gate, creating enough noise to be heard in town, and the gold guards head to the prison.

The gold is held in a safe in a cell, but only the warden knew the combination. Sledge locks the old man up in his former cell, adjoining the cell with the safe, which he heard being opened for years. By sound, the old man guides Bice (Corazzari) through opening the safe. The gold guards arrive and encounter armed, rioting prisoners and Sledge's gang. Ward is killed in the battle with the gold guards. The sheriff arrives again, and is killed in a running, horseback rifle-fight with Sledge.

The gang escapes and later stop to split the gold, with Sledge taking a double share, which the old man notes aloud. A musical montage shows a myriad of poker hands in which it appears the old man wins a substantial amount of the other outlaws' gold. Playing against Joyce, the old man finds that he has been cheated with sand substituted for gold dust and kills him.  Guthrie (Piani) objects to this, and angrily leaves after Sledge defends the old man's actions. Sledge then proceeds to win the old man's gold at poker, and most of everyone else's as well.

Sledge leaves with his winnings despite the gang's protestations, and the old man proposes they kidnap Ria. With her, they follow Sledge to a Spanish Mission town, deserted for a local festival. Now leading the gang, the old man attempts negotiating with Sledge, while one of the others tries to ambush him. Sledge is wounded while killing the bushwhacker, Kehoe, but still refuses to bargain, so the old man reveals their kidnapping of Ria, who is then badly hurt by Bice throwing her from a high wall. A horrified Hooker vows to kill Bice when they get the gold.

Hearing her screams, Sledge abandons the gold while fighting his way to Ria, who says they did not need the gold to be happy, and uses her dying breath to warn that Bice is behind him with a rifle. Sledge kills Bice, then Hooker (Akins), and wounds the escaping old man, who threatens that he has hidden the gold where it can never be found without him. Remembering Ria's words, Sledge kills the old man and rides away empty-handed as the town refills with locals.

Cast

 James Garner as Luther Sledge
 Dennis Weaver as Erwin Ward
 Claude Akins as Hooker
 John Marley as the "Old Man"
 Laura Antonelli as Ria
 Wayde Preston as Sheriff Ripley
 Ken Clark as Banjo Playing Deputy
 Tony Young as Mallory
 
 Herman Reynoso as Simms
 Steffen Zacharias as Red
Uncredited cast
 Paola Barbara as Jade
 Laura Betti as Sister
 Bruno Corazzari as Bice
 Remo De Angelis as poker player
 Altiero Di Giovanni as Kehoe
 Lorenzo Fineschi as Toby
 Franco Giornelli as Joyce
 Didi Perego as Elizabeth
 Lorenzo Piani as Guthrie
 Mario Valgoi as Beetle
 Vic Morrow as Gold Guard Scout
 Riccardo Garrone as Warden
 Luciano Rossi as 'The Wolf'
 Fausto Tozzi as prisoner
 Angelo Infanti as prisoner
 Franco Balducci as prisoner
 Tiberio Mitri as prisoner
 Barta Barri
 Orso Maria Guerrini
 Gianni Di Benedetto

Theme song
 Title of the song: "Other Men's Gold"
Lyrics by Bill Martin and Phil Coulter
Sung by Stefan Grossman
"Dino" Edizione Musicali - Rome

References

External links
 
 
 
 James Garner Interview on the Charlie Rose Show 
 James Garner interview at Archive of American Television - (c/o Google Video) - March 17, 1999

1970 films
1970s heist films
1970 Western (genre) films
Columbia Pictures films
Films directed by Vic Morrow
Films produced by Dino De Laurentiis
Films shot in Almería
Italian heist films
Spaghetti Western films
Films scored by Gianni Ferrio
English-language Italian films
1970s English-language films
1970s Italian films